Qi Hong (born June 3, 1976 in Shanghai) is a former Chinese international footballer who played as an attacking midfielder or shadow striker throughout his career.

At Shanghai Shenhua he won the league and Chinese FA Cup with them before controversially moving to then local neighbours Shanghai COSCO Huili. While internationally he was part of the Chinese squad that came fourth within the 2000 AFC Asian Cup as well as also being part of the squad that took part in the 2002 FIFA World Cup. Since retiring he would help form a local youth football club Shanghai Luckystar, however on October 12, 2010 he was detained by police for his involvement in fixing a league game against Tianjin Teda F.C. on November 30, 2003 and was sentenced to five and a half years imprisonment on June 13, 2012.

Club career
As a juvenile from Shanghai, he progressed at all the levels of the Shanghai Shenhua youth football training system and was a stand out player before he graduated into the senior side. Making his debut in the senior team at the 1995 league season, at the age of 19 years he made a big impression by scoring 6 league goals in 14 appearances that helped contribute to Shanghai Shenhua winning the league championship. He would cement his position within the team the following season when he played in a further 16 league games scoring 4 goals, however this was not enough from regaining the title and Shanghai unfortunately came second in the league to Dalian Wanda. During his seven seasons at Shanghai he was only able to add a Chinese FA Cup to his honours and despite coming runners up several times they were often beaten by the dominant Dalian Wanda.

Qi Hong would surprise many when he transferred to SFC's local rivals Shanghai COSCO Huili at the beginning of the 2002 league season. While the transfer initially saw Shanghai COSCO Huili better Shanghai Shenhua by coming in 9th compared to Shanghai Shenhua's 12th  and several seasons of that saw both teams fight for the title, Shanghai COSCO Huili decided to move to Xi'an and Qi left. Deciding to stay in Shanghai Qi played for Shanghai The 9 who were in the second tier as well as ending his career with Shanghai United.

After his retirement in 2007.1, he devote himself into cultivating Chinese youth football player. Therefore, he and his good friend Shen Si, who was also a national football player, launched a local football club called Shanghai Luckystar, with the goal to develop the super football player for china.

International career
Qi Hong would be called up into the Chinese senior squad in 1998 where he would establish himself as a regular known for his outstanding football awareness and technical ability rather than his physical strength. During his time with the national team he and fellow Shanghai team members, Fan Zhiyi and Xie Hui were called "The Three Musketeers". Qi Hong particularly endeared himself to the national team when he scored three key goals in the Asian zone second stage in qualifying for the 2002 World Cup finals against United Arab Emirates and Oman to send China to their first World Cup. Highly respected, Qi Hong was often the key to the Chinese attack on the pitch even though he lacked the physical presence of others, yet he was the leader on the football pitch and was a very popular and respected footballer despite being a low-key and modest character.

International goals

Match-fixing

On October 12, 2010, Qi Hong was reported to have been detained by the police and was said to be involved in fixing the November 30, 2003 league game against Tianjin Teda F.C. during his stint as a player at Shanghai International. The allegations suggest that his teammate Shen Si was bribed by former Tianjin Teda general manager Yang Yifeng a total of 12 million Yuan to lose the game and that Shen had asked teammates Qi Hong, Jiang Jin and Li Ming (1975) to help him. After being arrested by the police a lengthy wait eventually saw Qi Hong found guilty of match-fixing and was sentenced to five and a half years imprisonment on June 13, 2012 and fined 500,000 Yuan along with his associates except for Shen Si who was given six years.

Honours
Shanghai Shenhua
Chinese Jia-A League: 1995
Chinese FA Cup: 1998

References

External links

2002 World Cup Player Profile at BBC.co.uk

1976 births
Living people
Chinese footballers
Footballers from Shanghai
China international footballers
2002 FIFA World Cup players
2000 AFC Asian Cup players
Shanghai Shenhua F.C. players
Beijing Renhe F.C. players
Association football midfielders